The UNESCO (United Nations Educational, Scientific and Cultural Organization) has designated 41 World Heritage Sites in eleven countries (also called "State parties") of Southeast Asia: Indonesia, Vietnam, Thailand, Philippines, Malaysia, Myanmar, Cambodia, Singapore, and Laos. Only Brunei and East Timor lack World Heritage Sites.

Indonesia lead the list with nine inscribed sites, followed by Vietnam with eight inscribed sites, with the Philippines and Thailand having six each, Malaysia four, Cambodia and Laos three each, Myanmar two, and Singapore one. The first sites from the region were inscribed at the 15th session of the World Heritage Committee in 1991. The latest site inscribed is the Kaeng Krachan Forest Complex in Thailand, inscribed in the 44th session of the Committee in Fúzhōu, People's Republic of China, in July 2021. Each year, UNESCO's World Heritage Committee may inscribe new sites or delist those no longer meeting the criteria, the selection based on ten criteria of which six stand for cultural heritage (i–vi) and four for natural heritage (vii–x); some sites are "mixed" and represent both types of heritage. In Southeast Asia, there are 26 cultural, 14 natural and 1 mixed sites.

The World Heritage Committee may also specify that a site is endangered, citing "conditions which threaten the very characteristics for which a property was inscribed on the World Heritage List." One site in this region, Tropical Rainforest Heritage of Sumatra, is listed as endangered; Angkor and Rice Terraces of the Philippine Cordilleras were once listed but were taken off in 2004 and 2012 respectively.

By comparison with other world regions such as East Asia, South Asia, Middle East, Central America, and Western Europe, the designation of UNESCO sites in the Southeast Asian region has been regarded as 'too few and too slow' since the inception of the 21st century. Scholars from various Southeast Asian nations have suggested for the establishment of an inclusive Southeast Asian body that will cater to the gaps of the region's activities in UNESCO as the majority of nations in the region are underperforming in the majority of the lists adopted by UNESCO, notably the World Heritage List. More than 20 sites have been in the tentative list for more than 20 years.

Legend

Site; named after the World Heritage Committee's official designation
Location; at city, regional, or provincial level and geocoordinates
Criteria; as defined by the World Heritage Committee
Area; in hectares and acres. If available, the size of the buffer zone has been noted as well. A value of zero implies that no data has been published by UNESCO
Year; during which the site was inscribed to the World Heritage List
Description; brief information about the site, including reasons for qualifying as an endangered site, if applicable.

World Heritage Sites

Location of sites
Southeast Asia has the fewest UNESCO World Heritage Sites in Asia, next to Central and North Asia, despite being the base of the UNESCO Asia-Pacific headquarters located in Bangkok, Thailand and having a diverse line of natural and cultural heritage sites. Due to this, numerous scholars have been calling on Southeast Asian governments to participate and nominate more sites in UNESCO annually.

Various institutions have also criticized UNESCO for its 'Europe-centric' designations. An example of which was when UNESCO declared 10 UNESCO sites in Italy (a European country) in just a single year (1997). During the same time, 8 sites were declared for the entire Asian continent, where no designated site was located in Southeast Asia at all.

Green  -  Natural; Yellow -  Cultural; Blue   -  Mixed; Red    -  In danger

Performance of Southeast Asia in UNESCO
The performance of Southeast Asia is contrasted by the performance of South and East Asia. Southeast Asian countries are in blue.

UNESCO Tentative List of Southeast Asia
Brunei, Singapore and Timor-Leste currently have no tentative list sites. Both Brunei and Timor-Leste are presently undergoing comprehensive research for tentative site submissions . Malaysia, Viet Nam revised their tentative lists in 2017. Laos, Philippines and Myanmar revised their tentative lists in 2016, 2015 and 2014, respectively. Cambodia last revised its tentative list in 2020. Indonesia last revised their tentative lists in 2018. Thailand last revised their tentative lists in 2019. The following lists also include the current nomination process being focused on by each country.
 Cambodia: Currently in process of nominations on 27 March 2020
Beng Malea Temple (27/03/2020)
Ancient City of Oudong (27/03/2020)
Former M-13 prison/ Tuol Sleng Genocide Museum (former S-21)/ Choeung Ek Genocidal Centre (former Execution Site of S-21) (27/03/2020)
Koh Ker: Archeological site of Ancient Lingapura Or Chok Gargyar (27/03/2020)
Phnom Kulen: Archeological Site/Ancient Site of Mahendraparvata (27/03/2020)
The ancient complex of Preah Khan Kompong Svay (27/03/2020)
The Archeological complex of Banteay Chhmar (27/03/2020)
The Site of Angkor Borei and Phnom Da (27/03/2020)
 Indonesia: Currently in process of nominating Kebun Raya and Yogyakarta since 2018.
Betung Kerihun National Park (Transborder Rainforest Heritage of Borneo) (2004)
Bunaken National Park (2005)
Raja Ampat Islands (2005)
Taka Bone Rate National Park (2005)
Wakatobi National Park (2005)
Derawan Islands (2005)
Tana Toraja Traditional Settlement (2009)
Bawomataluo Site (2009)
Muara Takus Compound Site (2009)
Muarajambi Temple Compound (2009)
Trowulan - Former Capital City of Majapahit Kingdom (2009)
Prehistoric Cave Sites in Maros-Pangkep (2009)
Sangkulirang - Mangkalihat Karts: Prehistoric rock art area (2015)
Old Town of Jakarta (Formerly old Batavia) and 4 outlying islands (Onrust, Kelor, Cipir dan Bidadari) (2015) (Nominated in 2018)
Semarang Old Town (2015)
 Traditional Settlement at Nagari Sijunjung (2015)
 The Historic and Marine Landscape of the Banda Islands (2015)
 Historical City Centre of Yogyakarta (2017)
Kebun Raya Bogor (2018)
 Laos: Currently in process of nomination Vientiane in the world heritage list since 1992.
 Pha That Luang (Vientiane) (1992)
 Hin Nam No National Protected Area (2016)
 Malaysia: Currently in process of nominating Taman Negara to the world heritage list since 2014.
 National Park (Taman Negara) of Peninsular Malaysia (2014)
 FRIM Selangor Forest Park (2017)
 Gombak Selangor Quartz Ridge (2017)
 Royal Belum State Park (2017)
 Sungai Buloh Leprosarium (2019)
 Myanmar: Currently in process of nominating Mrauk U and Shwedagon to the world heritage list since 1996.
 Wooden Monasteries of Konbaung Period: Ohn Don, Sala, Pakhangyi, Pakhannge, Legaing, Sagu, Shwe-Kyaung (Mandalay) (1996)
Badah-lin caves (1996)
 Ancient cities of Upper Myanmar: Innwa, Amarapura, Sagaing, Mingun, Mandalay (1996)
Myauk-U Archaeological Area and Monuments (1996)
Inle Lake (1996)
Mon cities: Bago, Hanthawaddy (1996)
Ayeyawady River Corridor (2014)
Hkakabo Razi Forest Complex (2014)
Indawgyi Lake Wildlife Sanctuary (2014)
Natmataung National Park (2014)
Myeik Archipelago (2014)
Hukaung Valley Wildlife Sanctuary (2014)
Taninthayi Forest Corridor (2014)
 Philippines: Currently in process of nominating Mayon Volcano and Batanes in the world heritage list since 1993.
 Batanes Protected landscapes and seascapes (1993)
 The Tabon Cave Complex and all of Lipuun (2006)
 Paleolithic Archaeological Sites in Cagayan Valley (2006)
 Kabayan Mummy Burial Caves (2006)
 Butuan Archeological Sites (2006)
 Baroque Churches of the Philippines (Extension)(2006)
 Petroglyphs and Petrographs of the Philippines (2006)
 Neolithic Shell Midden Sites in Lal-lo and Gattaran Municipalities (2006)
 Chocolate Hills Natural Monument (2006)
 Mt. Malindang Range Natural Park (2006)
 Mt. Pulag National Park (2006)
 Apo Reef Natural Park (2006)
 El Nido-Taytay Managed Resource Protected Area (2006)
 Coron Island Natural Biotic Area (2006)
 Mt. Iglit-Baco National Park (2006)
 Northern Sierra Madre Natural Park and outlying areas inclusive of the buffer zone (2006)
 Mt. Mantalingahan Protected Landscape (2015)
 Mayon Volcano Natural Park (MMVNP) (2015)
 Turtle Islands Wildlife Sanctuary (2015)
 Thailand: Currently in process of nomination Phuphrabat Historical Park. 
 Phuphrabat Historical Park (2004)
 Wat Phra Mahathat Woramahawihan, Nakhon Si Thammarat (2012)
 Monuments, Sites and Cultural Landscape of Chiang Mai, Capital of Lanna (2015)
 Phra That Phanom, its related historic buildings and associated landscape (2017)
 Ensemble of Phanom Rung, Muang Tam and Plai Bat Sanctuaries (2019)
 The Ancient Town of Si Thep (2019)
 The Andaman Sea Nature Reserves of Thailand (2021)
 Viet Nam: Currently in process of nominating Sapa in the world heritage list since 1997.
 The Area of Old Carved Stone in Sapa (1997)
 Huong Son Complex of Natural Beauty and Historical Monuments (1991)
 Cat Tien National Park (2006)
 Con Moong Cave (2006)
 The Complex of Yen Tu Monuments and Landscape (2014)
 Ha Long Bay – Cat Ba Archipelago (2017)
 Ba Be - Na Hang Natural Heritage Area (2017)

See also 
 Intangible Cultural Heritage Register of Southeast Asia
 Southeast Asia Memories of the World Register
 UNESCO Biosphere Reserves of Southeast Asia
 
 List of World Heritage Sites in Indonesia
 List of World Heritage Sites in Thailand
 List of World Heritage Sites in the Philippines
 List of World Heritage Sites in Malaysia
 List of World Heritage Sites in Cambodia
 List of World Heritage Sites in Vietnam

Notes

References

General sources
 
 
 

Asia, Southeast
World Heritage Sites